Lansdale is a borough in Montgomery County, Pennsylvania, United States. It is a densely-populated commuter town, with many residents traveling daily to Philadelphia using SEPTA Regional Rail's Lansdale/Doylestown Line. In 1900, 2,754 people lived here; in 1910, 3,551; and in 1940, 9,316 people were inhabitants of Lansdale. The population was 18,773 at the 2020 census.

Lansdale is the center of the North Penn Valley, a region which includes the surrounding townships and boroughs.

History

Founding

The earliest known settlers in Lansdale were members of the Jenkins family. At the peak of its growth, the Jenkins homestead occupied approximately 120 acres of land.  The construction of the North Pennsylvania Railroad (later absorbed into the Reading Railroad) during the 1850s contributed to rapid growth and expansion in Lansdale.  Employment opportunities generated by the railroad brought settlers, housing, and local businesses to the area.

Borough incorporation
By 1872, Lansdale Borough was officially incorporated and named after Phillip Lansdale Fox, chief surveyor of the North Penn Railroad. By the naming conventions of the time, it should have been called Jenkintown, since the land immediately surrounding the train station was owned by the Jenkins family, but there was already a town by that name along the rail line.

The Jenkins Homestead and Lansdale Silk Hosiery Compy-Interstate Hosiery Mills, Inc. are listed on the National Register of Historic Places.

Kugel ball

Lansdale is home to a Kugel ball, which is a  dark grey granite sphere supported by a very thin film of water pumped from beneath its base. The Kugel Ball is located in Railroad Plaza, adjacent to the SEPTA Lansdale/Doylestown Line train station in downtown Lansdale. The plaza consists of a bricked patio with benches centered on the Kugel Ball and closes at 11:00 pm. An annual 5k race is held in June, accordingly named the Kugel Ball race, which starts and ends at the actual Kugel Ball in Railroad Plaza.

Hometown heroes
The Lansdale Borough Hometown Heroes Banner Program is a living tribute created for the community to recognize and honor Lansdale Veterans who are serving or are veterans who have served in the United States Armed Forces.

Geography
It has a hot-summer humid continental climate (Dfa) and the hardiness zone is 6b. The average monthly temperature ranges from 30.2 °F in January to 74.7 °F in July. The average annual absolute minimum temperature is -0.4 °F.

Demographics

As of the 2010 census, the borough was 75.9% White, 5.9% Black or African American, 0.2% Native American, 13.3% Asian, 0.1% Native Hawaiian, and 2.7% were two or more races. 4.4% of the population were of Hispanic or Latino ancestry.

Government

Lansdale has a city manager form of government with a mayor and a nine-member borough council. On June 4, 2008, local chiropractor G. Andrew Szekely was appointed by council resolution to serve the remaining 18 months of the term of Mayor Michael DiNunzio. Szekely won a full four-year term in November 2009. The current mayor of Lansdale is Garry Herbert, who was voted into office in January, 2018.

The borough is part of the First Congressional District (represented by Rep. Brian Fitzpatrick), Pennsylvania's 53rd Representative District (represented by Rep. Steve Malagari) and the 24th State Senate District (represented by Sen. Bob Mensch).

Education
The community is a part of the North Penn School District. K-6 public elementary schools in Lansdale include Gwynedd Square Elementary, Knapp Elementary, Oak Park Elementary, Inglewood Elementary, Walton Farm Elementary, and York Avenue Elementary. Penndale Middle School serves grades 7–9. The area public high school is North Penn High School in Towamencin Township.

The borough is also home to Mater Dei Catholic School of the Roman Catholic Archdiocese of Philadelphia. It was formerly home to St. Stanislaus School. In January 2012, the archdiocese announced that St. Rose of Lima School in North Wales would be merging with St. Stanislaus, with students attending classes in Lansdale at St. Stanislaus. The newly combined school was renamed from St. Stanislaus to Mater Dei, Latin for "Mother of God."

Calvary Baptist School is a pre-K-12th grade Christian school. Lansdale area private high schools include Lansdale Catholic High School and Dock Mennonite Academy. Dock is in Towamencin Township.

The DeSales University Lansdale Area Campus was an institute of higher education, with a campus specifically designed for adult students. The campus closed in 2019, with classes moved to the main campus in Center Valley or online.

Media
Lansdale is served by the daily print newspaper The Reporter, owned by the Digital First Media and with a circulation of 16,364 throughout Lansdale, Hatfield, Souderton and Harleysville. As well as the online news sites North Penn Now and Montgomeryville-Lansdale Patch. 

WNPV (1440 AM) was a radio station broadcasting a news/talk/sports format, whose air date began October 17, 1960 and ended April 30, 2020. The station sold off its land, studio and broadcast towers to North Penn School District in July 2020. Its license was donated to Four Rivers Community Broadcasting. 

North Penn Television is a television station owned by the North Penn School district that broadcasts the North Penn School District Board of School Directors meetings, along with various events around the school district such as sports games and concerts.

Arts and entertainment 
Lansdale hosts a first friday during the warmer months, it includes live music, food trucks, a beer garden, and local events like scavenger hunts or food drives. 

Every September Lansdale is home to Bike Night, where thousands of motorcyclists gather. 

Since 2017, Lansdale has been home to the popular music and entertainment venue, The Underground, which is owned and operated by Round Guys Brewing Company. The Underground no longer hosts live music or open mics but still has other events.  

The Rock Den is a music store that hosts weekly open mic nights and shows. It is located in the former Staurt's music building that has been home to a music store since the 1940s. 

There are also regular open mic nights at other local venues, including Small Batch Kitchen and Well Crafted. 

In 2022, a documentary "Lansdale, Then, Now and Forever" was released about the local music scene. Directed by Jason Zoblin. 

Classic Game Junkie opened an arcade in 2022.

Infrastructure

Transportation

The main east–west street in Lansdale is Main Street (Pennsylvania Route 63), which runs northwest–southeast. The main north–south street is Broad Street, which runs southwest–northeast. Pennsylvania Route 363 begins at PA 63 on the western edge of Lansdale and heads southwest on Valley Forge Road. The Lansdale interchange of the Pennsylvania Turnpike Northeast Extension (Interstate 476) is located to the west of the borough in Towamencin Township and connects to PA 63.

Lansdale is served by SEPTA Regional Rail's Lansdale/Doylestown Line via Lansdale station in downtown, the Pennbrook station in the southern part of the borough, and the 9th Street station in the northern part of the borough, with service to Center City Philadelphia and Doylestown along with intermediate points. Three SEPTA Suburban Division bus routes serve Lansdale: the Route 94 connects the southern part of Lansdale with the Montgomery Mall and Chestnut Hill, the Route 96 connects Lansdale with the Norristown Transportation Center in Norristown, and the Route 132 connects the borough with the Montgomery Mall and Telford.

Lansdale is the headquarters of the Pennsylvania Northeastern Railroad, a short-line freight railroad. The Pennsylvania Northeastern Railroad operates the Lansdale Yard in the borough and provides freight rail service out of Lansdale to several points in the northern suburbs of Philadelphia on SEPTA-owned lines. The railroad interchanges with CSX Transportation in Lansdale.

Utilities
Lansdale Electric, owned by the borough, provides electricity to most of Lansdale, with portions of the borough receiving electricity from PECO Energy Company, a subsidiary of Exelon. The borough's electric department purchases its electricity from American Municipal Power. Natural gas in Lansdale is provided by PECO Energy Company. The North Penn Water Authority provides water to Lansdale and some surrounding areas. Sewer service in Lansdale is provided by the borough, which operates a wastewater treatment facility. Trash and recycling collection in Lansdale is provided by contracts with private haulers, although the borough has plans for a single hauler serving all residents.

Health care
Jefferson Health–Abington operates Jefferson Lansdale Hospital, which serves Lansdale and surrounding areas in the North Penn Valley. Jefferson Lansdale Hospital has 140 beds and over 700 employees, including over 300 physicians. Services offered at the hospital include an emergency room, Orthopedic and Spine Institute, Pain Center, Sleep Center, and Wound Care Center. The hospital, which was previously known as North Penn Hospital and later as Central Montgomery Medical Center, was acquired by Abington Memorial Hospital from Universal Health Services in October 2008, with the name changed from Central Montgomery Medical Center to its present name.

Notable people
Ralph F. Hirschmann (1922–2009), biochemist who led synthesis of the first enzyme.
 Margaret Battavio (Little Peggy March) (born 1948), American pop singer. Her song "I Will Follow Him" was number one in April 1963.
 Russell Hoban (1925–2011), expatriate writer, author of Riddley Walker and the Frances the Badger children's books, was born and grew up in Lansdale.
Jennifer Strong ( – 2011), soccer player.
Liza Weil (born 1977), actress known for her portrayal of Bonnie Winterbottom in the television series How to Get Away with Murder and for her portrayal of Paris Geller in Gilmore Girls; was born in Passaic, New Jersey but her family has resided in the borough since 1984; Weil is a 1995 alumnus of North Penn High School.
 The Wonder Years, a pop-punk band signed to Hopeless Records.
 Ralph James Wickel (1921–2001), Lansdale High School alum served in WWII, awarded tennis scholarship at Temple University, competed in regional and national tennis tournaments. Selected for Junior Davis Cup competition and participated in the US Championships in the early 1950s.
 Paul Bateson (born 1940), radiological technician seen playing one in The Exorcist, later convicted of murdering a film critic and suspected in a series of murders of gay men in late '70s New York.
Joe Judge (born 1981), former head coach of the New York Giants.
Charles "Baird" Parker (1952-2014), the son of Charlie Parker and one of the owners of the former Birdland Music; lived in Lansdale for a number of years until his death. Baird was born in NYC.
Annie Christ, a local drag performer. 
Froggy, an all-female three piece riot grrrl band formed in 2020; one of their songs was featured in the film Clerks 3.

In popular culture
An episode of the Fox television series Fringe, which aired on September 24, 2009, was set in Lansdale. The scenes that took place in Lansdale were filmed in British Columbia, and the town was depicted as a rural area consisting primarily of corn fields and not as the densely populated suburban town that it actually is.

The beginning of the House season 7 episode "Changes" (May 2, 2011) was set in Lansdale.

References

External links

 
 
 Borough of Lansdale

 
Populated places established in 1872
Boroughs in Montgomery County, Pennsylvania
1872 establishments in Pennsylvania